Nowend Yenrique Lorenzo Cabrera (born 2 November 2002) is a Dominican professional footballer who plays as a winger for Spanish club CD Izarra.

International career
On 7 January 2021, Lorenzo was called up by the Dominican Republic national team manager Jacques Passy for a friendly against Puerto Rico. He made his full international debut twelve days later, starting in the 0–1 loss at the Estadio Olímpico Félix Sánchez in his hometown.

References

External links

2002 births
Living people
Sportspeople from Santo Domingo
Dominican Republic footballers
Association football wingers
Dominican Republic international footballers
Dominican Republic emigrants to Spain
Naturalised citizens of Spain
Spanish footballers
CA Osasuna players

CD Izarra footballers